The 2017–18 Belgian First Division A was the 115th season of top-tier football in Belgium. The season began on 28 July 2017 and concluded on 20 May 2018. The fixtures were announced in early June 2017. Anderlecht were the defending champions but had to settle for third place with Club Brugge taking their 15th title.

Team changes
 Westerlo was relegated after finishing last in the 2016–17 Belgian First Division A.
 Antwerp was promoted after winning the promotion play-offs against Roeselare.

Teams

Stadiums and locations

Personnel and kits

Managerial changes

Regular season

League table

Results

Championship play-offs
The points obtained during the regular season were halved (and rounded up) before the start of the playoff. As a result, the teams started with the following points before the playoff: Club Brugge 34 points, Anderlecht 28, Charleroi 26, Gent 25, Genk 22 and Standard Liège 22. The points of Club Brugge, Anderlecht and Charleroi were rounded up, therefore in case of any ties on points at the end of the playoffs, the half point will be deducted for these teams.

League table

Europa League play-offs
Group A of the play-offs will consist of the teams finishing in positions 7, 9, 12 and 14 during the regular season and the first and third placed team in the qualifying positions in the 2017–18 Belgian First Division B. The teams finishing in positions 8, 10, 11, 13 and 15 will join the second placed qualifier from the 2017–18 Belgian First Division B in group B.

Group A

Group B

Semi-final
The winners of both play-off groups competed in one match to play the fourth-placed or fifth-placed team of the championship play-offs for a spot in the final. Zulte Waregem received home advantage as they finished higher in the regular season. Despite going down twice with 10 men, Zulte Waregem won, which meant they advanced to the final to play for a spot in the second qualifying round of the 2018–19 UEFA Europa League.

Final
The winners of the Europa League play-off semi-final and the fifth-placed team of the championship play-offs played one match to determine the Europa League play-off winners. The winners qualified for the second qualifying round of the 2018–19 UEFA Europa League.

Number of teams by provinces

Season statistics

Top scorers

Hat-tricks

Updated to match(es) played on 14 April 2018.

Top assists

Clean sheets

Notes

References

Belgian Pro League seasons
Belgian First Division A
1